Rommel: Battles for Tobruk is a 1985 video game published by Game Designers' Workshop.

Gameplay
Rommel: Battles for Tobruk is a game in which the four major World War II battles for the city of Tobruk (Operation Brevity, Operation Battleaxe, Operation Crusader and the Battle of Gazala) are simulated.

Reception
M. Evan Brooks reviewed the game for Computer Gaming World, and stated that "Overall, Rommel is an extremely detailed simulation. But the detail clutters playability to an unconscionable degree so that Rommel becomes an exercise in frustration."

Reviews
Computer Gaming World - Dec, 1991
Current Notes

References

External links
Review in ANALOG Computing

1985 video games
Atari 8-bit family games
Atari 8-bit family-only games
Computer wargames
Cultural depictions of Erwin Rommel
Game Designers' Workshop games
Turn-based strategy video games
Video games about Nazi Germany
Video games developed in the United States
Video games set in Libya
World War II video games